Aslanbəyli is a municipality and village in the Qazakh Rayon of Azerbaijan. It has a population of 3,772.

References

Populated places in Qazax District
Elizavetpol Governorate